The Meso-Melanesian languages are a linkage of Oceanic languages spoken in the large Melanesian islands of New Ireland and the Solomon Islands east of New Guinea. Bali is one of the most conservative languages.

Composition
The languages group as follows:
Willaumez linkage:  Bola, Bulu, Meramera, Nakanai
Bali–Vitu: Bali (Uneapa), Vitu (Muduapa) [may be a single language]
New Ireland – Northwest Solomonic linkage

Tungag–Nalik family:  Tigak, Tungag, Nalik, Laxudumau, Kara, Tiang
Tabar linkage: Madara (Tabar), Lihir, Notsi
Madak linkage: Barok, Lavatbura-Lamusong, Madak
Tomoip
St George linkage
Niwer Mil
Warwar Feni
Fanamaket
Sursurunga
Konomala
Patpatar–Tolai:  Patpatar, Lungalunga (Minigir), Tolai (Kuanua)
Label–Bilur:  Label, Bilur
Kandas–Ramoaaina:  Kandas,  Ramoaaina
Siar
Northwest Solomonic linkage

Ethnologue adds Guramalum to the St George linkage.

The Willaumez Peninsula on the north coast of New Britain was evidently the center of dispersal.

Johnston (1982) combines the Willaumez and Bali–Vitu branches into a single Kimbe branch, for which he reconstructs Proto-Kimbe.

Language contact
Lenition in Lamasong, Madak, Barok, Nalik, and Kara may have diffused via influence from Kuot, the only non-Austronesian language spoken on New Ireland (Ross 1994: 566).

References

 
Western Oceanic languages